Khalid Salim El Abed (born 24 May 1993) is a former footballer who is last known to have played as a defender for Ter Leede. Born in the Netherlands, he was a youth international for Jordan.

Career

Club career

As a youth player, he joined the youth academy of Dutch top flight side Ajax. In 2013, El Abed signed for TOP Oss in the Dutch second tier, where he made 4 league appearances and scored 0 goals. On 23 August 2013, he debuted for TOP Oss during a 1-0 win over Fortuna Sittard. After that, El Abed signed for Dutch fifth division club Ter Leede.

International career

He is eligible to represent Jordan internationally.

References

External links
 

Dutch footballers
Footballers from Amsterdam
Jordanian footballers
Living people
Association football defenders
1993 births
TOP Oss players
Ter Leede players
Eerste Divisie players